The 1974 Primera División season was the 83rd season of top-flight football in Argentina. Newell's Old Boys won the Metropolitano (1st title) and San Lorenzo (9th title) won the Nacional championship.

For the second consecutive season, no teams were relegated.

Metropolitano Championship

Group A

Group B

2nd place playoff
Boca Juniors 2–0 Ferro Carril Oeste

Final Tournament

Nacional Championship

Group A

Results

Group B

Results

Group C

Results

Group D

Results

Final Tournament

Results

References

Argentine Primera División seasons
Argentine Primera Division
Primera Division